Boley may refer to:


People
 Bruno A. Boley (1924–2017), longtime Dean of Engineering at Northwestern University
 Donna Boley (born 1935), American politician
 George Boley (born 1949), Liberian politician and former rebel leader
 Joe Boley (1896–1962), American Major League Baseball player
 May Boley (1881–1963), American actress
 Michael Boley (born 1982), American former National Football League player
 Prince Mark Boley (born 1989), Liberian footballer
 Frank Dancewicz (1924-1985), American National Football League quarterback nicknamed "Boley"

Places
 Boley, Oklahoma, United States, a town
 Boley, Templeport, a townland in County Cavan, Ireland

Other uses
 Boley Building, Kansas City, Missouri, on the National Register of Historic Places
 Boley, another name for pastures used in the rundale grazing system used in Ireland

See also
 Boly (disambiguation)